1864 in sports describes the year's events in world sport.

Association football
Events
 7 December — Notts County, then called Notts FC, is formally established and remains the oldest club in the Football League

Australian rules football
 Carlton Football Club was founded in Victoria on July.

Baseball
National championship
 National Association of Base Ball Players champion – Brooklyn Atlantics
Events
 The Atlantic club of Brooklyn, New York suffers only one early tie.  One match is at Rochester against the Young Canadian club of Woodstock, Ontario, 75–11.
 New rules empower the umpire to "call" balls (bad pitches) and eventually award first base on balls, practically limiting the number of pitches and the length of each batsman's turn.

Boxing
Events
 Tom King retires and the English Championship becomes vacant till 1866.
 American Champion Joe Coburn tries unsuccessfully to set up a fight with former English Champion Jem Mace.  There are challenges to Coburn from Mike McCoole and Jimmy Elliott.

Cricket
Events
 Law 10 is rewritten by MCC to allow a bowler to bring his arm through at any height providing he keeps it straight and does not "throw" the ball. The issue of overarm bowling has crystallised in the Willsher-Lillywhite incident of August 1862. 
 The concept of a champion county gains popularity when newspapers begin to publish tables of inter-county match results
 12 January — formation of Lancashire County Cricket Club at a meeting in Manchester
 27–29 January — Otago v. Canterbury at Dunedin is the start of first-class cricket in New Zealand
 Madras v. Calcutta is the start of first-class cricket in India
 First issue of Wisden Cricketers' Almanack
England
 Most runs – Will Mortlock 855 @ 34.20 (HS 105)
 Most wickets – James Grundy 99 @ 11.31 (BB 9–19)

Golf
Major tournaments
 British Open – Tom Morris senior

Horse racing
Events
 Inaugural running of the Travers Stakes at Saratoga Springs, New York is won by Kentucky
England
 Grand National – Emblematic
 1,000 Guineas Stakes – Tomato 
 2,000 Guineas Stakes – General Peel
 The Derby – Blair Athol
 The Oaks – Fille de l'Air 
 St. Leger Stakes – Blair Athol
Australia 
 Melbourne Cup – Lantern
Canada
 Queen's Plate – Brunette

Rowing
The Boat Race
 19 March — Oxford wins the 21st Oxford and Cambridge Boat Race
Other events
 29 July — Yale wins the fifth Harvard–Yale Regatta, its first victory. The Race is resumed after three years off although the American Civil War will continue to next April.

Rugby football
Events
 Foundation of Huddersfield RLFC which is the oldest Rugby Football League member

References

 
Sports by year